The 1968 IV FIBA International Christmas Tournament "Trofeo Raimundo Saporta" was the 4th edition of the FIBA International Christmas Tournament. It took place at Sports City of Real Madrid Pavilion, Madrid, Spain, on 24, 25 and 26 December 1968 with the participations of Real Madrid (champions of the 1967–68 FIBA European Champions Cup), Uruguay, Meralco Reddy Kilowatts and Picadero.

League stage

Day 1, December 24, 1968

|}

Day 2, December 25, 1968

|}

Day 3, December 26, 1968

|}

Final standings

References

1968–69 in European basketball
1968–69 in Spanish basketball